Kamalashile is a village located 35 km from Kundapura taluk in Udupi district.  It is 120 km from Mangalore. Kamalashile is known for Sri Bramhi Durga Parameswari temple. It is an ancient temple and frequent Chandi Homa/Yagna are conducted here. Kamalashile jathre is celebrated annually in April.

References 

Villages in Udupi district